Trebisacce is a town and comune in the province of Cosenza in the Calabria region of southern Italy. It is 92 km from the provincial capital of Cosenza, overlooking the Ionian Sea.

Twin towns — sister cities
Trebisacce is twinned with:

  Mazara del Vallo, Italy

References